Gasanda is a village in the Commune of Bururi in Bururi Province in southern Burundi. It is located southwest of Bururi and the Bururi Forest Reserve is in the area.

References

External links
Satellite map at Maplandia.com

Populated places in Bururi Province